Cystomatochilina is an extinct genus of ostracods in the order Palaeocopida.

2 species are described (C. elegans and C. umbonata). Both are from the Silurian. C. elegans is described from central Bohemia.

References

External links 

 
 Cystomatochilina at biolib.cz

Prehistoric ostracod genera
Podocopa genera
Silurian crustaceans